Stridex (originally spelled Stri-Dex) is an American acne treatment and prevention medicine, originally registered trademark of Bayer Corporation. It comes in the form of fibrous pads saturated with astringents. Most products in the Stridex line contain as the active ingredient salicylic acid (0.5–2.5%); Stridex Power Pads instead contain benzoyl peroxide (2.5%), a nonprescription acne treatment medication. However, they also warn about possible side effects: dryness of the skin, possible burning, and tingling. Patients are advised to apply treatment with caution around lips, nose and mouth, or cuts and scrapes, and also avoid excessive sun exposure. In 2013, FDA started to investigate a possible link between benzoyl peroxide- and/or salicylic acid-based acne prevention medicine with hypersensitivity and anaphylactic reactions without calling off any products or placing warnings.

Stridex were the first acne treatment pads to do so without requiring a prescription for purchase and is part of the Smithsonian's permanent collection. It is owned by Blistex, Inc.

References 

Acne treatments